Beaubourg may refer to:

 An area within the 4th arrondissement of Paris, France
 Colloquial name of Centre Pompidou, an art centre in the Beaubourg area of Paris
 Croissy-Beaubourg, Seine-et-Marne, Île-de-France, France
 Beaubourg (album), a 1978 avant-garde electronica album by Vangelis